Pourquoi Pas (from French pourquoi pas? 'why not?') may refer to:
 , the name of several ships
 Pourquoi Pas Island, an island of Antarctica
 Pourquoi Pas Point, a headland of Antarctica
 Pourquoi pas! (Why Not!), a 1977 French film starring Sami Frey